Hans Baumann (born 28 March 1910) was an Austrian cross-country and Nordic combined skier who competed in the 1936 Winter Olympics. He was a member of the Austrian relay team which finished eighth in the 4×10 km relay competition. In the Nordic combined event, he finished 17th place.

References

1909 births
Year of death missing
Austrian male Nordic combined skiers
Austrian male cross-country skiers
Olympic Nordic combined skiers of Austria
Olympic cross-country skiers of Austria
Nordic combined skiers at the 1936 Winter Olympics
Cross-country skiers at the 1936 Winter Olympics
20th-century Austrian people